Vishnevskaya may refer to:

Galina Vishnevskaya (1926-2012), Russian opera singer
Rostropovich-Vishnevskaya Foundation, American non-profit organization
4919 Vishnevskaya, main-belt asteroid